A ski train is a passenger train which is marketed to carry passengers to ski resorts. A ski train may only operate during the winter sports season, or it may operate more frequently and have extra capacity during the winter sports season.

Ski trains in North America

Ski trains in the United States
Ski trains are trains specifically used for carrying skiers from populated cities to ski areas in the United States.  Most were located in northeast, going from cities such as New York City and Boston to ski areas such as Bousquet Ski Area and Chickley Alp.  But when ski areas such as the latter closed in the 70s and 80s ski trains began to close.  Ski Train cars were designed or converted to carry skis on the side or on the inside.  Ski Trains were at the height of their popularity in the late thirties through the mid fifties.

Examples
Milwaukee Ski Bowl 1938-1950 (closed during several WWII years), Snoqualmie, Washington. Milwaukee Road trains (officially Chicago, Milwaukee, St. Paul, and Pacific Railroad) from Seattle and Tacoma offered recreation coaches for dancing. First night ski train.
Sunday River Ski Train (1993-1996)
Denver and Rio Grande Western Railroad Ski Train (1940-2009), later revived and rebranded as the Winter Park Express (2015, 2017–present)
Boston & Maine's Snow Train
Gore Mountain Snow Train (1934-1940s and 2011-present)
Wachusett Mountain

Ski trains in Canada

Examples
 P'tit Train du Nord, which linked Montreal to ski hills and cross-country ski lodges in the Laurentides-region Laurentians

Ski trains in Europe
Railway companies in Alpine countries operate extra trains during the winter sports season to carry skiers. These are often marketed as Ski Trains. SBB (Swiss Federal Railways) market their trains under the name 'Snow’n’Rail'.

Current long distance ski trains 

 Under the name Travelski Express, a non-stop Eurostar train London - Moûtiers / Bourg Saint Maurice (French Alps) will operate on Friday night and Saturday (daytime) during the 2021-2022 ski season. This train is chartered by Compagnie des Alpes and is sold only in a package with a stay.
 Bourg Saint Maurice (French Alps) also has winter-only day-time services from Amsterdam and Brussels operated by Thalys, and from Paris by SNCF.
 The Austrian Alps have winter-only ski night trains (with sleeping cars) from the Netherlands (Alpen Express / Alps-Express), Germany and other countries.
 Although operating the whole year, the Austrian operator Nightjet (ÖBB) have long distance night trains (with sleeping cars) from Amsterdam, Brussels, Hamburg (and Paris from December 2021), which in winter have a considerable amount of passengers to several winter sport destinations around Innsbruck and Vienna.

Other trains primarily serving skiers
 The Dorfbahn Serfaus carries skiers from a parking lot to the ski lift
 many mountain railways in the Swiss Alps primarily serve skiers in the winter season

References

 New England Lost Ski Areas Project
 Eurostar Ski Train London to the French Alps
 Switzerland's 'Snow’n’Rail' trains

Passenger rail transport